is a ferry harbour and a village on the German island of Fehmarn.  It lies on an important route between Germany and Denmark known as the Vogelfluglinie which crosses the  strait, the Fehmarnbelt, to Rødby on the island of Lolland.

Overview 
From 1945 to 1963, the ferry route from West Germany to Denmark had run between Großenbrode and Gedser. A train ferry terminal was built in Puttgarden in 1961-63 and at the same time Fehmarn was connected to the mainland by bridge. Since the completion of the Great Belt Fixed Link in Denmark, the route via Puttgarden became less used by trains and Puttgarden station closed in 2022. The harbour is still used by Scandlines ferries, with a fleet of four ferries giving one connection every 30 minutes, 24 hours a day.

Future bridge/tunnel

A fixed link — a bridge or a tunnel — is planned across the Fehmarn Belt. Originally planned as a bridge, the current plan is for a tunnel, comprising both a road and a rail link. The Danish government will finance construction. The fixed link will have road fees comparable to the ferry fees. It is planned to be completed in 2028.

See also 
Puttgarden station
List of bridge-tunnels

External links 

 Scandlines (Ferry to Rødby)

Villages in Schleswig-Holstein
Ostholstein
Fehmarn
Port cities and towns of the Baltic Sea
Denmark–Germany border crossings
Marinas in Germany
Populated coastal places in Germany (Baltic Sea)